Yellow Bus Line, Incorporated (YBLI) is a large bus company in Mindanao. It operates bus transport services in the Central and Southern Mindanao with its headquarters in General Santos. Its company-owned terminals and offices are located in General Santos and Koronadal City.

History
Yellow Bus Line Incorporated was founded on 13 July 1958 by the Yap Family of the Municipality of Koronadal (also known as Marbel, now called City of Koronadal) in South Cotabato. Yellow Bus Line is the first bus company and the second largest in Mindanao with more than 200 units plying the routes in Sultan Kudarat, South Cotabato, Maguindanao, North Cotabato, Sarangani Province, and Davao.
Their base of operations are located in Koronadal and General Santos. YBL is the first bus company in the Philippines to implement fixed regular wage for its drivers and conductors. In year 2015 they conducted NC III qualification exams for all their drivers and conductors.

Prior to 2011, the main fare classes for the company's bus units were the non-airconditioned Super Deluxe and the airconditioned Mabuhay Class units. In 2011, as they bought Higer Bus and Yutong units from China, they introduced the Premiere Class unit, equipped with WiFi internet connection. A year later in 2012, as they procured the first bus unit in Mindanao with a built-in comfort room from Higer Bus, they introduced the Executive Class unit, also equipped with WiFi internet connection.

In March 2017, they procured their first bus units from Ankai. In June of the same year, they also purchased units from Zhongtong.

Fleet 
As of October 2022.

Routes of service
When Yellow Bus Line was first established in 1958, its first route of service was Cagayan-Marbel route. However, the said route was discontinued in the year 1978 in favor of the then-newly opened Davao-General Santos-Marbel route which they continue to serve to this day. The company continued to expand its service area throughout the years, serving the provinces of South Cotabato, Sarangani, Sultan Kudarat, North Cotabato, Davao del Sur and Maguindanao.

The routes serviced by Yellow Bus Line are all vice versa.

General Santos to Isulan via Koronadal & Tacurong
General Santos to Esperanza via Koronadal, Surallah & Isulan
General Santos to Maitum via Maasim & Kiamba
General Santos to Kidapawan via Koronadal, Tacurong, Datu Paglas & M'lang
Koronadal to General Santos via Polomolok & Tupi
Davao to Tacurong via Digos, Bansalan, Makilala & Datu Paglas
Davao to Isulan via Digos, General Santos, Koronadal & Tacurong

Gallery

See also
Davao Metro Shuttle
Husky Tours
Mindanao Star Bus Transport, Inc.
List of bus companies of the Philippines

References

Bus companies of the Philippines
Transportation in Mindanao
Companies based in General Santos